American Trucker was a television show on the Speed cable channel. Hosted by Robb Mariani, the pilot episode featured Robb helping another mechanic restore one of the classic 1980 Kenworth K-100 Aerodyne trucks used in the TV show B. J. and the Bear, along with a short piece about the world's largest truck stop, the Iowa 80.  American Trucker ran a total of 28 episodes across 2 seasons.

The show was produced by Bud Brutsman and Steve Beebe of Overhaulin' fame.  Show content was derived from Robb's knowledge and experience with trucks and trucking history.  Robb was a past cast member of HGTV's Design Star series. Dan Bruno, the owner of such famous trucks as the Rubber Duck's Mack truck from Convoy and past owner of the Peterbilt tanker from Duel is credited on the show as a technical consultant.

Speed (TV network) original programming
English-language television shows
2011 American television series debuts
2011 American television series endings